Yekaterina Konstantinovna Guseva (9 July 1976) is a Russian film, theater, TV actress and singer, Meritorious Artist of Russia. She became famous for her role in the 2002 television series Brigada.

Early life
In Guseva's childhood, her father played the violin; it was his violin depicted in the series Brigada. Her younger sister, Nastya, works as a methodologist in a kindergarten.

By age four, she was already part of the modern gymnastics resource group for the Soviet Union's representative team. She also tried figure skating and swimming. Seven years before finishing school, Katya was involved in the Georgian dance ensemble Kolkhida and managed to perform in the Bolshoi.

While planning to enroll at the Moscow Biotechnology Institute, she was approached by an assistant to theatre director Evgeny Simonov who suggested she should apply for the V.V. Shukina Performing Arts College. She gave it a try, prepared for the entry exam during three days, and made it with ease.

Life and career
After graduation in 1997, Yekaterina played a major role in the film Snake Spring by Nikolai Lebedev. Then, she was invited by Mark Rozovsky to his theater "Nikitsky Gate." After working four years in Rozovsky theater, she won the role of Katya Tatarinova in musical Nord-Ost by Alexei Ivashchenko and Georgi Vasiliev. During preparation for "Nord-Ost" premier, Yekaterina earned a fame by paying major role in the popular Russian crime miniseries Brigada. She had a day off during the terrorist attack on the theater in October 2002. Since 2003 she works in Mossovet Theatre.

In addition to playing in many popular Russian movies, Yekaterina performs songs as a solo singer and together with Leonid Serebrennikov and others. She released her first solo music CD album in 2007.

Family
Yekaterina Guseva is married to businessman Vladimir Abashkin. They have two children.

Selected filmography

Television

Films

Theatre
Teatr "U Nikitskih vorot" (1997—2001):
Bednaya Liza (Бедная Лиза)
Doktor Chekhov (Доктор Чехов)
Romansy s Oblomovym (Романсы с Обломовым)
Lyubov' i zhizn' ubitogo studenta (Любовь и жизнь убитого студента)
Gambrinus (Гамбринус)
Ubivets (Убивец)
Utinaya okhota (Утиная охота)
Tri porosenka (Три поросёнка, English title: Three Little Pigs)
Prodyuserskaya kompaniya "Link" (2001—2003):
Nord-Ost
Mezhdunarodnoe teatral'noe agentstvo "Art-Partner XXI" (2002):
Stoletnik (Столетник)
Mossovet Theatre (2003—present):
Uchitel' tantsev (Учитель танцев)
Strannaya istoriya doktora Dzhekila i mistera Hayda (Странная история доктора Джекила и мистера Хайда, English title: Strange Case of Dr Jekyll and Mr Hyde)
V prostranstve Tennessi U. (В пространстве Теннесси У.)
Iisus Khristos — superzvezda (Иисус Христос - суперзвезда, English title: Jesus Christ Superstar)
Tsarstvo otsa i syna (Царство отца и сына)
Teatrium na Serpuhovke (2006—present):
Drakon (Дракон)
Stage Entertainment (October 2008 - April 2010):
Krasavitsa i Chudovishche (Красавица и чудовище, English title: Beauty and the Beast)
Moskovskaya gosudarstvennaya akademicheskaya filarmoniya (2009):
Skazki s orkestrom (Сказки с оркестром)

References

External links

Kino-teatr.ru
Kinopoisk.ru
Ruskino.ru
Kinomania.ru
Her Youtube channel
Abortive flight, song of Vladimir Vysotsky, performed by Yekaterina Guseva (Version with English subtitles)

1976 births
Living people
Russian film actresses
Russian television actresses
Russian stage actresses
21st-century Russian actresses
Honored Artists of the Russian Federation
Actresses from Moscow
Russian voice actresses
Musical theatre actresses
21st-century Russian singers
21st-century Russian women singers